Adv Lawrence Mabendle Mushwana (born 3 March 1948) was the Public Protector of South Africa before advocate Thuli Madonsela succeeded him. Mushwana was appointed by President Thabo Mbeki from October 2002 until October 2009.

Mushwana is a lawyer by profession with a Bachelor of Laws from the University of Zululand. From 1972 to 1975 he worked as an interpreter at the Bushbuckridge Magistrate's Court. From 1992 until 2003 he worked as an attorney with Mushwana Attorneys.

He is a member of the African National Congress, having served in the Limpopo Provincial Executive from 1994 to 2002, and in the National Executive from 1999 until 2002. From 1999 to 2002 he was also the Deputy Chair of the National Council of Provinces. He was appointed as the South African Public Protector in 2002 and at the end of his term in 2009 he left to chair the South African Human Rights Commission.

References

Government of South Africa
Ombudsmen in South Africa
1948 births
Living people
Members of the African National Congress